Zhou Wei may refer to:

Zhou Wei (lawyer) (born 1956), Chinese constitutional law scholar and lawyer
Zhou Wei (zoologist) (born 1957), Chinese zoologist
Zhou Wei (athlete) (born 1976), Chinese track and field athlete
Zhao Wei (born 1976), Chinese actress